Holly Christian Tshimanga Kanyinda (born 25 April 1997) is a Belgian footballer who currently plays for Rupel Boom as a striker.

Career 

Tshimanga played with Genk as a junior. He made his first team debut with K.R.C. Genk in the UEFA Europa League on 4 August 2016 against Cork City.

Personal life
Born in Belgium to parents of Congolese descent, Holly is the younger brother of Belgium international Derrick Tshimanga.

References

External links

Belgian footballers
Belgian expatriate footballers
Belgium youth international footballers
Belgian people of Democratic Republic of the Congo descent
1997 births
Living people
K.R.C. Genk players
SK Austria Klagenfurt players
AS Verbroedering Geel players
K. Patro Eisden Maasmechelen players
K. Rupel Boom F.C. players
Belgian Pro League players
Belgian Third Division players
Austrian Football Bundesliga players
Association football forwards
Belgian expatriate sportspeople in Austria
Expatriate footballers in Austria
People from Duffel
Footballers from Antwerp Province